Qurtlujeh may refer to:
 Qurtlujeh-e Olya
 Qurtlujeh-e Sofla